John Rushing (February 26, 1972 – October 23, 2020) was an American college and professional football assistant coach who previously served as the safeties coach at the University of Arizona. Rushing served for six years as a defensive coach at Utah State University and was the secondary coach for three other college programs.

Born and raised in Merced, California, Rushing played college football at Washington State University in Pullman under head coach Mike Price, and was a four-year starter as a defensive back for the Cougars.

His brother is Hamilton Tiger-Cats wide receiver Kevin Robinson.

Rushing died on October 23, 2020, at the age of 48.

References

External links
University of Arizona Wildcats bio

1972 births
2020 deaths
People from Merced, California
Place of death missing
Players of American football from California
Green Bay Packers coaches
Washington State Cougars football players
Willamette Bearcats football coaches